Jérôme Sans (born 1960) is a director of contemporary arts institutions, critic and curator, based in Paris.

Jérôme Sans, born on 2 August 1960 in Paris, is a French artistic director, director of contemporary art institutions, art critic, and curator.

Biography

He co-founded with Nicolas Bourriaud the Palais de Tokyo in Paris in 2002, which they directed until 2006, and then directed a private institution in China, the Ullens Center for Contemporary Art (UCCA) in Beijing, which he developed from 2008 to 2012. He is a member of the board of directors of UCCA.

Jérôme Sans also worked from 2006 to 2013 as Global Curator for Le Méridien Hotels & Resorts.

In 2012, he created the magazine L'Officiel Art of which he was the creative director and editor-in-chief until 2014.

From 2015 to 2017, Jérôme Sans was the co-artistic director of the Grand Paris Express cultural project. From 2017 to 2020, he was the designer and director of the artistic and cultural centre on the upper tip of the Ile Seguin, developed by the Emerige group. Since 2010 he has been artistic director of the urban redevelopment programme "Rives de Saône - River Movie" for the Lyon metropolitan area. Finally, since 2022, he has accompanied the development of LagoAlgo, a new hybrid living and cultural space in Mexico City.

He has curated many major exhibitions around the world, including the Taipei Biennial (2000), the Lyon Biennial (2005), Nuit Blanche in Paris (2006), and Li Qing at the Prada - Rong-Zhai Foundation (2019) in Shanghai, Pascale Marthine Tayou at the Clément Foundation, La Martinique, Erwin Wurm at the Taipei Fine Arts Museum (2020) and then at the Museum of Contemporary Art in Belgrade (2022).  Most recently, he curated the installation Au cours des mondes by Alicja Kwade on Place Vendôme in Paris. 

Between 1994 and 1996, Jérôme Sans is adjunct curator of the Magasin 3 in Stockholm, Sweden, and from 1996 to 2003, of the Milwaukee Institute of Art & Design in Milwaukee, United States. In 1997 and 1998, he is the art director and curator of two editions of the Printemps de Cahors event (France) : One Minute Scenario (with Dennis Hopper, Doug Aitken, Thomas Demand, Pierre Huyghe, Valérie Jouve, Ken Lum, Jonas Mekas, Jack Pierson and La sphère de l'intime. He co-curated with Nicolas Bourriaud, the Contemporary Art Biennial at the Musée d'art contemporain de Lyon (2005), titled L’expérience de la durée; and the Parisian Nuit Blanche in 2006, a public event for one night in the streets of Paris.

Institute of Visual Arts (INOVA), Milwaukee, Wisconsin (1996–2003)
From 1996 to 2003, Jérôme Sans was adjunct curator of the Milwaukee Institute of Art & Design in Milwaukee, where he presented a serie of solo exhibitions of artist of the new generation of artists, shown for the first time in an institution in the US: Maurizio Cattelan, Pierre Huyghe, Erwin Wurm, Kendell Geers, Philippe Parreno, Barthélémy Toguo, Steve McQueen, Kimsooja, Joachim Koester, Annelis Strba, Lars Nilsson, Annika von Hauswolff...

Palais de Tokyo, Paris (1999–2006)
Jérôme Sans was from 1999 until 2006 the co-founder and director of the acclaimed Palais de Tokyo (center for contemporary creation) in Paris (France) with Nicolas Bourriaud. This place became one of the most important art institution in Europe, contributing to the international large audience for a lot of French artists.

For the Palais de Tokyo, he has worked with the architects Anne Lacaton and Jean-Philippe Vassal to make the reopening of the place, and with the architect Stéphane Maupin to make the restaurant. Jérôme Sans has imagined new economical strategies for the managing of artistic projects, involving brands for the first time in such art institutions.

In 6 years, the Palais de Tokyo has welcomed more than 1 million of visitors. It was the pioneer of a movement of reconciliation between the City of Light and contemporary art. It has been emulated as a model and for its programming well beyond the frontiers of France, both among specialists, art-lovers, and the wide public.

During this period, the Palais de Tokyo presented more than 80 solo exhibitions (Tobias Rehberger, Chen Zhen, Wolfgang Tillmans, Kendell Geers, Candice Breitz, Wang Du, Bruno Peinado, Katharina Grosse…), 8 group exhibitions (Translation, Hardcore, Live, GNS, Notre histoire…), and more than one hundred events, concerts and performances (Laurent Garnier, Marina Abramovic, Jan Fabre, Christophe).

Baltic Centre for Contemporary Art, Gateshead (2006–2008)
Jérôme Sans was from 2006 until 2008 the artistic director of the Baltic Centre for Contemporary Art in Gateshead, one of the most important art place in Europe, which he contributed to re-establish Baltic as the most creative place in UK. In a former flourmill, the Baltic is an international centre for contemporary art, it presents a constantly changing programme of exhibitions and events. Jérôme Sans has curated numerous solo shows there, as Kendell Geers, Subodh Gupta, Brian Eno, Kader Attia and Wang Du…

Ullens Center for Contemporary Art, Beijing (2008–2012)
From 2008 to 2012, Jérôme Sans was the former director of the ground breaking Ullens Center for Contemporary Art in Beijing (UCCA), created by the Belgian collector Guy Ullens as the first private art center in China. Jérôme Sans has established a new economy for the art center to make the UCCA a place of reference for Chinese and international contemporary art (more than 67 exhibitions & 1500 events in 4 years). Jérôme Sans has collaborated with the architect Jean-Michel Wilmotte to redefine the structure of the center and adapt its Bauhaus style to flexible exhibition spaces. Jérôme Sans has been serving as an ambassador for Chinese contemporary art. He was devoted in the building of local and international profile of the UCCA with a world-class program of exhibitions, actively promoting Chinese contemporary art globally by fostering a vigorous dialogue between local and international artists and audience. He helped to bring a new economy to the art center, working with local and international partners. 
He is now a member of the Advisory Board of the UCCA.

Le Méridien (2006–2013)
From 2006 to 2013, Jérôme Sans was Global Cultural Curator for Le Méridien Hotels & Resorts, a première in the hospitality industry.

Gathering a community (LM100) of interdisciplinary creators/ambassadors (artists, architects, chefs, filmmakers, photographers, perfumes designers... each of them recognized in its field for its innovation), Jérôme Sans reinvented the vocabulary of the company, around the three words "Chic, Culture and Discovery", placing it as a contemporary and unique hospitality group, engaged in today's culture.

Jérôme Sans appropriated all areas of life and the most everyday gestures, turning them into "moments" dedicated to a set of sensual and creative experiences; from the olfactory identity of the brand, to its original soundtrack, through the breakfast signature and a creative wine menu or the in situ creation of works of art in the hotels. Jérôme Sans has also introduced the establishment of magnetic collector cards made by artists, not only giving access to the room but also to the opportunity to discover for free, the most creative cultural institutions of the cities in which the Méridien's hotels are based worldwide.

"River Movie", Rives de Saône (2010–2014)
Since 2010, Jérôme Sans has been appointed as artistic Director of the 50 km reorganization of the Lyon docks around the Saône river, one of the most important program of permanent art in public space in Europe.

More than 10 international artists (Tadashi Kawamata, Jean-Michel Othoniel, Didier Faustino, Lang-Baumann, Elmgreen & Dragset, Le Gentil Garçon, Erik Samakh, Pascale Marthine Tayou, Meshac Gaba) have created site-specific works that will be installed permanently on the docks, contributing to the artistic highlight of the City of Lyon. The program has been created through a unique dialogue between architects,  landscape architects and artists. The first phase of the program was completed in September 2013 as more than 17 km featuring a dozen works was implemented in situ.  The next phases will be executed in 2014 and 2015.

Grand Paris Express (2015-2017)
Jérôme Sans has recently been appointed as the artistic co-director of the Grand Paris Express together with José-Manuel Gonçalvès by the Société du Grand Paris. This future metropolitan "super underground" will extend over a length of 200 km and will include 68 stations conceived by different architects and designers. Within an integrated approach to the localities/territories and with the aim to accompany the transformation phase, the artistic and cultural direction will contribute together with the creators, designers, architects and the engineers already engaged for the construction of the new underground to the creation of a metropolitan artistic heritage.

Polygone Riviera, Cagnes-sur-Mer, (since 2015)
From 2015, Jérôme Sans has been named artistic director of the art program of Polygone Riviera (Cagnes-sur-Mer, France), designed by the Unibail-Rodamco group and Socri. Polygone Riviera is the first open-air shopping centre in France and is also a cultural venue that focuses strongly on contemporary art, with eleven works by world-renowned artists placed on display at the centre (Ben, Céleste Boursier-Mougenot, Daniel Buren, César, Antony Gormley, Tim Noble & Sue Webster, Jean-Michel Othoniel, Pablo Reinoso, Pascale Marthine Tayou and Wang Du).

During the summer 2016, a number of works by Joan Miró were displayed at the heart of the shopping centre, thanks to a partnership with the Maeght Foundation located nearby.

Contemporary art venue led by Emerige, Ile Seguin, Boulogne, Paris 

Led by the Emerige group, a new artistic and cultural project consisting of a place for contemporary art, a multiplex cinema and a hotel focusing on contemporary creation is currently being developed for the upstream tip of Seguin Island, which will benefit from one of the largest cultural concentrations in Europe. Jérôme Sans has been appointed artistic director for the prefiguration of the future contemporary art venue, designed by Catalan architects RCR Arquitectes, winners of the prestigious Pritzker Prize 2017. The venue, which will play a major role in this new cultural, social and economic dynamic, will embody within this exceptional island site the regeneration of the place of art as an inspiring space open to the world, in the image of today's creativity.

L'Officiel Art (2012–2013)
In 2012–13, Jérôme Sans was creative director and editor in chief of the quarterly art magazine « L’Officiel Art », which is published by the Editions Jalou (Paris). 
By joining Les Editions Jalou to direct l’Officiel Art, he has bet on a new generation of art magazines in which art and artists narrate and encounter an interwoven world with fashion, style and all contemporary creative expressions. (« If art is a way of life, L’Officiel Art is its magazine »). L’Officiel Art aims to place artists at the centre of this cross-cultural debate. 
Jérôme Sans managed the first eight issues of the magazine. Eight artists have been invited to create a special cover : Daniel Buren, Farhad Moshiri, Bertrand Lavier, Yan Pei-Ming, Sterling Ruby, Marina Abramovic & Terence Koh, Loris Gréaud et Youssef Nabil.

Lago/Algo, Mexico City (2022)
LagoAlgo is a private initiative opened in February 2022. Supported by CMR - operator of the Del Lago restaurant - in partnership with OMR as the space's cultural arm, ALGO in collaboration with Jérôme Sans as Artistic Director.

LagoAlgo is a hybrid initiative where art and culture in general are at the forefront of the beating heart of this adventure. An open platform of dialogs and exchanges to look at, question, and potentially reinvent the world; a world in which we are definitely connected to nature, concerned with our shared future and its sustainability. A place to live, where art and life are unified. LagoAlgo is not a fixed model, but in permanent flux, like a snowball it will mutate and change through time, regularly adding new usages, forms of projects, or include various new actors or collaborations. LagoAlgo is, by definition, a new space for living and sharing.

Exhibitions Curated
Jérôme Sans has curated over 300 solo and group shows worldwide, in art institutions and outside, among others:
 New French Painting (1983), traveling exhibition in England (Riverside Studios, Londres; Modern Art Oxford; John Hansard Gallery, Southampton; Fruitmarket Gallery, Edinburg)
 F. Four French (1986), (with Sophie Calle, Bernard Frize, IFP) Lang & O'Hara Gallery, New York
 Viennese Story (1992), Wiener Secession, Vienna (with Douglas Gordon, Rirkrit Tiravanija, Erwin Wurm, Chen Zhen, Eric Duyckaerts, Sam Samore, Wendy Jacob, Kendell Geers, Angela Bulloch, Rainer Ganahl 
 Life style/International Kunst - Mode, Design, Styling Interieur und Werbung (1998), Bregenz Kunstmuseum (with John Armleder, Daniel Buetti, Dejanov/Heger, Sylvie Fleury, Peter Kogler, Pipilotti Rist, Gerwald Rockenshaub, Cindy Sherman, Heimo Zobernig
 Pierre Huyghe (1999), Fundaçao de Serralves, Porto
 The Snowball (1999) for the Danish Pavilion at the 48th Venice Biennale, where he invited the American artist Jason Rhoades and Danish Peter Bonde to work together (questioning for the first time in this international event, the nationality issue);
 Pierre Huyghe, The Process of Leisure Time (1999), Wiener Secession, Vienna;
 The Taipei Biennale, entitled The Sky Is The Limit (2000), Taipei Fine Art Museum (with Candice Breitz, Loris Cecchini, Claude Closky, Meschac Gaba, Kendell Geers, Hsia-Fei Chang, Shu Lee Chang, Pascale Marthine Tayou, Henrik Plenge Jakobsen, Wang Du...), developing this event to an international dimension 
 My Home is Yours, Your home is mine (2001) co-curated with Hou Hanru at the Rodin Museum in Seoul, Korea & at the Tokyo City Opera Art gallery, Japan
 Voices Over, Arte All'arte (2001), co-curated with Pier Luigi Tazzi in several cities in Tuscany with Marina Abramovic, Cai Guo Qiang, Pascale Marthine Tayou, Jannis Kounellis, Surasi Kusolwong, Nari Ward
 Tutto Normale (2002) in the gardens of the Villa Médicis Rome with Alighiero Boetti, Olaf Breuning, Claude Lévêque, Gianni Motti, Mimmo Paladino, Giuseppe Penone, Paola Pivi, Barthélémy Toguo
 Intermission (2002) at the Pitti Foundation in Florence (Italy)
 Jan Fabre, Save Your Soul (2005), Maison Jean Vilar, during the Festival d'Avignon
 Here Comes the Sun (2005), co-curated with Daniel Birnbaum, Rosa Martinez and Sarit Shapira), Magasin 3, Stockholm with Pilar Albarracín, Francis Alÿs, Ghada Amer, Tacita Dean, Elmgreen & Dragset, Olafur Eliasson, Tobias Rehberger, Jeroen De Rijke & Willem De Rooij
 Restlessness by Jan Lauwers at Bozar Brussels (2007)
 It’s Not Only Rock’n’Roll Baby! Bozar Brussels, 2008 and Milan Triennial, 2010
 That's Fucking Awesome menalKlinik at Haskoy Yarn Factory (Istanbul) in 2011
 Le coup du fantôme (2013) with Sun Yuan & Peng Yu in Lille (France).
 AS I RUN AND RUN, HAPPINESS COMES CLOSER (2014) some selected pieces in Laurent Dumas's collection by Jérôme SANS at Hotel Beaubrun in Paris
 One Way: Peter Marino, Bass Museum, Miami (2014-2015)
 Painting as Shooting: Liu Xiaodong, avec la Fondation Faurschou, Fondazione Cini, Venise (2015)
 Diary Of An Empty City: Liu Xiaodong, Fondation Faurschou, Beijing (2015)
 Painting as Shooting : Liu Xiadong, Fondation Faurschou, Copenhague (2016)
 Sislej Xhafa, Love you without knowing, The National Gallery of Kosovo (2018)
 Lilian Bourgeat, Des Mesures, Polygone Riviera, Cagnes-sur-mer (2018)
 :mentalKLINIK, OBNOXIOUSLY HAPPY, La Patinoire Royale, Galerie Valérie Bach, Bruxelles (2018)
 Eldorama, Lille 3000, Tripostal, Lille, Jérôme Sans, Jean-Max Colard avec la collaboration d'Isabelle Bernini (2019)
 Les Enfants du Paradis, MuBA, Tourcoing, Jérôme Sans, Jean-Max Colard avec la collaboration d'Isabelle Bernini (2019)
 Golden Room, Palais des Beaux-Arts de Lille, Jérôme Sans, Jean-Max Colard avec la collaboration d'Isabelle Bernini (2019)
 Pascale Marthine Tayou, Black Forest, Fondation Clément, Martinique (2019)
 Racing the Galaxy, Nur-Sultan, Kazakhstan, Jérôme Sans, Dina Baitassova (2019)
 Li Qing: Rear Windows, Fondation Prada, Prada Rongzhai, Shanghai (2019)
 Li Qing: Blow Up, Almine Rech, Londres (2019)
 Pablo Reinoso, Supernature, Polygone Riviera, Cagnes-sur-Mer (2019)
 Yu Hong: The World of Saha, The Long Museum, Shanghai (2019)
 Erwin Wurm: One Minute in Taipei, Taipei Fine Arts Museum [archive], Taipei (2020)
 Voyages Immobiles, for the 60 years of diptyque, Poste du Louvre, Paris (2021)
 Signs of the Times, Apalazzo Gallery, Brescia (2021)
 Floating Studio, Galerie Hussenot, Paris (2021)
 One minute forever, Erwin Wurm, Museum of Contemporary Art, Belgrade (2022)
 Shake Your Body, Lago/Algo, Mexico City (2022)

Books and publishing
Jérôme Sans has contributed to various art publications. Such as : Purple, Flash Art, Artforum, Artpress, UOVO, Tema Celeste, as well as participated in the development of numerous exhibition catalogs for museums or private institutions.

In 1998, Jérôme Sans published the reference book Au Sujet de about Daniel Buren (Flammarion) followed by two others on the artists Jonas Mekas (Just Like A Shadow, Steidl, 2000) and Chen Zhen (Les entretiens, Presses du Réel, 2003). He also authored Araki by Araki (a compendium of pictures made by Nobuyoshi Araki), published by Taschen in 2001, In The Arab World Now published by Galerie Enrico Navarra in 2008 and Intermission 1 (a collection of photographs by Hedi Slimane), published by Pitti Immagine in 2002.

In 2004 he joined forces with Bertil Scali, publisher and reporter, to launch Scali Editions, a publishing house dedicated to the publication of works around underground and current cultures (pop rock music, rap, electro, poetry, fiction, cinema, contemporary art, literature, notebooks, and eroticism) on neglected themes and subjects on the fringe or controversial such as the history of Gay Pride by Olivero Toscani or the Goth culture by Patrick Eudeline. Approximately 200 books were published between 2004 and 2008 with authors including Richard Bronson, Jonas Mekas, Virginie Despentes, Nina Roberts, Jean-Charles de Castelbajac, Joey Starr, Bruce Benderson, Marie Darrieusec, and Brian Epstein.

More recently, Jérôme Sans completed a series of pocket books that incorporate interviews with artists and architects (Kendell Geers 2013, Ma Yansong 2012, Jannis Kounellis 2012), published by BlueKingfisher Lmt. He is currently working on a new volume about the American artist John Giorno.

He is also the author of Araki on Araki, a collection of photos by the artist Nobuyoshi Araki, published by Taschen in 2000; In The Arab World Now, published by the Enrico Navarra Gallery in 2008; and a collection of photos by Hedi Slimane, Intermission 1, published by Pitti Immagine in 2002. In 2015, he  also publishes, with Jean-Marc Decrop, the book China: The New Generation (Ed. Skira), on the emerging Chinese art scene. In 2016, he publishes with Marla Hamburg Kennedy Lipstick Flavor: A contemporary art story with photography (Ed. Damiani).
In 2018, together with Laura Salas Redondo, he publishes the book Cuba Talks: Interviews with 28 artists (Ed. Rizzoli), revealing the dynamism of the contemporary Cuban art scene. In 2019, with Racing the Galaxy (Ed. Skira), catalogue of the eponymous exhibition in Nur-Sultan, Kazakhstan, which he curated with Dina Baitassova, he highlights the major and emerging figures of a emergent Kazakh art scene and its free spirit of nomadism, in dialogue with artists from other parts of the world.

Films
Jérôme Sans is the co-author with Pierre Paul Puljitz of the documentary "Jonas Mekas, I Am Not A Filmmaker" (2012), which has been screened at numerous films festivals. He is preparing another film about the artist Kenneth Anger. He is currently preparing a new documentary dedicated to the American author, movie director & artist Kenneth Anger.

He collaborated with Kiki Allgeier on the making of portrayals of the members of the creative community LM100 for Le Méridien Hotels & Resorts (between 2006 and 2013); and directed the movie « Breaking the silence » about AIDS in Mozambique, a special command from the UNICEF.
For the website of Whitewall Magazine in 2012, Jérôme Sans made two video portraits of 3mn on the architect Ma Yansong and the painter Yu Hong.

He has also been the artistic director of a portrait of MadeIn Company (Xu Zhen) in his studio about a work made for the Biennale de Lyon 2013. This film, directed by Yang Bo (4.20 min) and produced for Zilli, is available on the company website and was screened alongside the work of the artist.

Music

Jérôme Sans is also the founder of the French electro pop band Liquid Architecture, created with Audrey Mascina. Their first album "Revolution is Over" was produced by the French record label Naïve in 2006. In 2009, as the first French band to be signed on the Chinese label, Modern Sky, they released their second album "I Love to Love."

Bibliography (selection)
 Pascale Marthine Tayou, Vaudou Child, Entretien In/Interrompu avec Jérôme Sans, Beaux-Arts de Paris Editions, 2021
 Erwin Wurm, One Minute in Taipei, Taiwan, Taipei FIne Arts Museum Editions, 2020
 Adel Abdessemed, Catalogue raisonné des cartons d'invitation [expositions personnelles 2001-2019], Editions Marval-RueVisconti, 2020.
 Pascale Marthine Tayou, Black Forest, HC Editions, 2020.
 Racing the Galaxy, Jérôme Sans, Dina Baitassova, Skira, 2019.
 Jannis Kounellis, Naviguer entre les écueils, Galerie Lelong & Co, 2019.
 Cuba Talks, interviews with 28 contemporary artists, Jérôme Sans, Laura Salas Redondo, Rizzoli, 2019.
 Lipstick Flavor, A contemporary art story with photography, Jérôme Sans, Marla Hamburg Kennedy, Damiani, 2016.
 One Year with Zhao Zhao & Jérôme Sans, Pékin, Beijing Tang Contemporary Art, 2015.
 CHINA THE NEW GENERATION, Jérôme SANS, Jean-Marc DECROP, SKIRA, 2014
 Hand Grenades From My Heart, Kendell Geers edited by Jérôme Sans, Blue Kingfisher, 2013.
 Art China Now : And Tomorrow, Hong Kong, Blue Kingfisher, 2013.
 Smoke Shadows, Jannis Kounellis interviewed by Jérôme Sans, Blue Kingfisher, 2012.
 Bright City, Ma Yansong interviewed by Jérôme Sans, Blue Kingfisher. 2012.
 Raqib Shaw, Of beasts and super-beasts, Thaddaeus Ropac Gallery, Paris, 2012.
 Peter Lindbergh : The Unknown, Schirmer/Mosel Verlag, 2011, 200 pages
 Goudemalion : Jean-Paul Goude une rétrospective, Editions de la Martinière, 2011.
 Farhad Moshiri', Editions Ropac, Janssen, The Third Line & Perrotin, 2010.
 Wim Delvoye : knockin' on heaven's door, Tielt : Lannoo; Brussel : BOZAR Books, 2010
 China talks: interviews with 32 contemporary artists by Jerôme Sans, Beijing: Timezone 8, 2009.
 In the Arab world... Now, Enrico Navarra Gallery, 2008, Volume 3.
 Between the Silence : Fairy Tales by Sam Samore, New York : Starwood Hotels & Resorts Worlwilde, Le Méridien Books, 2007.
 Jonas Mekas: anecdotes, Paris: Scali, 2007.
 Jan Lauwers, Mercator, 2007. Jan Fabre, Acte sud, 2005.
 Jan Fabre, Arles, Actes sud, 2005.
 Chen Zhen: les entretiens, Paris: Palais de Tokyo; Dijon: Les Presses du réel, 2003.
 Araki by Araki, Taschen, 2002.
 Hedi Slimane, Intermission 1, Pitti Immagine, 2002.
 Kader Attia, Alter Ego''', Kamel Mennour Gallery, 2002 (Exposition, 19 April – 14 May)
 Pierre & Gilles, Arrache Mon Coeur, Jérôme de Noirmont Gallery, 2001 (Jérôme Sans, Joram Harel)
 Au sujet de..., Interview with Daniel Buren, Paris: Flammarion, 1998.
 Erwin Wurm: One Minute Sculptures, Cantz, 1998.
 Place de L'ecriture, cinq oeuvres par Joseph Kosuth, de 'One and Three Chairs' à 'Ex-Libris', J.-F. Champollion (Figeac)', Actes Sud, Arles, 2002, 46 pp. (Guy Amsellem, Joseph Kosuth, Martin Malvy, Jérôme Sans)
 « State of Emergency » in Mounir Fatmi, fuck the Architect, Lowave, 2009, 256 pp. (Pierre-Olivier Rollin, Frédéric Bouglé, Jean de Loisy, Paul Ardenne, Ariel Kyrou, Martina Corgnati, Jérôme Sans, Evelyne Toussaint, Nicole Brenez, Marc Mercier)

References

External links
 https://web.archive.org/web/20140311113030/http://leadingculturedestinations.com/magazine/ambassador-qanda/jerome-sans/
 http://vimeo.com/25555485

Living people
French art critics
French musicians
1960 births
French male non-fiction writers
French art curators